Swing Hostess is a 1944 American musical comedy film directed by Sam Newfield for Producers Releasing Corporation and starring Martha Tilton, Iris Adrian, Charles Collins, Betty Brodel, Cliff Nazarro and Harry Holman. The film's sets were designed by the art director Paul Palmentola.

Plot summary 
A down-on-her-luck would-be singer keeps encountering roadblocks on her way to stardom. Judy Alvin (Martha Tilton) has a fine voice but is no match for the politics of a musical producer pushing his girlfriend, the amazingly untalented Phoebe (Betty Brodel, the sister of Joan Leslie) who has obtained employment by using a record of Judy's voice rather than hers.

Living at a theatrical boarding house with a variety of eccentric entertainers, Judy's best friend Marge (Irish Adrian) is determined to find Judy a job to pay her bills that has something, anything, to do with music.  A chance encounter with a Rock-Ola 3701 Master telephone juke box gets Judy employment at the company where the duties involve taking telephone calls from patrons of a bar selecting music to hear over loud speakers.

Cast 
Martha Tilton as Judy Alvin
Iris Adrian as Marge O'Day
Charles Collins as Benny Jackson
Cliff Nazarro as Bobo
Harry Holman as Fralick
Emmett Lynn as Blodgett
Betty Brodel as Phoebe
Claire Rochelle as Fralick's Secretary
Paul Porcasi as Spumoni
Terry Frost as Hank
Philip Van Zandt as Merlini, the Magician
Earle Bruce as Joe Sweeney
Bob Gooding as 1st Butch, Speciality Act
Walter Pietila as 2nd Butch, Speciality Act
Gene Windson as 3rd Butch, Speciality Act
Dave White as Chick, Chick and Chuck Dance Team
John Evans as Chuck, Chick and Chuck Dance Team

Soundtrack 
Martha Tilton - "Let's Capture That Moment" (Written by Jay Livingston, Ray Evans and Lewis Bellin)
Martha Tilton - "Say It With Love" (Written by Jay Livingston, Ray Evans and Lewis Bellin)
Betty Brodel - "Say It With Love"
Martha Tilton - "I'll Eat My Hat" (Written by Jay Livingston, Ray Evans and Lewis Bellin) Also performed as an instrumental at the Tropics Club
Martha Tilton, Iris Adrian, Earle Bruce, and Cliff Nazarro - "Highway Polka" (Written by Jay Livingston, Ray Evans and Lewis Bellin)
Martha Tilton - "Got an Invitation" (Written by Jay Livingston, Ray Evans and Lewis Bellin)
Martha Tilton - "Music to My Ears" (Written by Jay Livingston, Ray Evans and Lewis Bellin) Also sung twice by Betty Brodel

Notes

External links 

1944 films
American musical comedy-drama films
1940s romantic comedy-drama films
1940s musical comedy-drama films
American black-and-white films
Films directed by Sam Newfield
Producers Releasing Corporation films
American romantic musical films
American romantic comedy-drama films
1940s romantic musical films
1944 comedy films
1944 drama films
1940s English-language films
1940s American films